Won Mi-kyung (born April 24, 1960) is a South Korean actress. Won was born in Chuncheon, Gangwon, South Korea. She graduated from Seoul Girls' High School. Won is referred to as one of "The Troika of the 1980s" along with Lee Mi-sook, and Lee Bo-hee, all of whom dominated the screen of the period. Won's glamorous body attracted male audiences. After Won Mi-kyung won the Miss Lotte title in 1978, she started her acting career as a TV actress of TBC.

Filmography
*Note; the whole list is referenced.

Awards

References

External links

1960 births
South Korean film actresses
South Korean television actresses
Living people
Best Actress Paeksang Arts Award (film) winners
Best Actress Paeksang Arts Award (television) winners